The Central District of Zeberkhan County ( is a district (bakhsh) in Zeberkhan County, Razavi Khorasan Province, Iran. At the 2006 census, its population was 44,466, in 12,096 families. The district has three cities: Darrud, Kharv, and Qadamgah. The district has two rural districts (dehestan): Ordughesh Rural District and Zeberkhan Rural District.

References 

Districts of Razavi Khorasan Province
Nishapur County